Hochheim am Main (Old English: Hockamore) is a town in the Main-Taunus district of the German state of Hesse. It is located near the right bank of the river Main three miles above its confluence with the Rhine, as well as on the German Timber-Frame Road.

Geography

Location
Located in the Rheingau, Hochheim has historically been a centre of the wine trade. The English word "hock", a generic term for Rhine wine, is derived from Hochheim.

History
There is a historical reference to Hochheim in the chronicles as early as the 7th century. Hochheim is the site of an Austrian military victory over the French Empire on 7 November 1813.

Town partnerships
Hochheim has the following twinned towns:
 Le Pontet, France since 1987
 Bonyhád, Hungary since 1997
 Kölleda

Education
Local children attend school in Hochheim until the Year 11 (UK) or 10th grade (US). After that, if they choose to continue with their education, they have to attend schools in Wiesbaden or Mainz.

Notable residents
Anne Heitmann, poet
Valentin Petry, cyclist
Carl Graeger (1849-1902), established Sekthaus Carl Graeger winery in 1877

See also
Schüler, Geschichte der Hochheim am Main (Hochheim, 1888)

References

External links
Official website of the government of Hochheim, in German
 
 Cultural monuments in Hochheim am Main (185 data entries)
 
 
 digitalised version of the Hochheimer Stadtanzeiger (local paper) 1911–1932
 Postal history, philately, postcards and archives

Towns in Hesse
Main-Taunus-Kreis
Rheingau